Tonse East  is a census town in the southern state of Karnataka, India. It is located in the Udupi taluk of Udupi district in Karnataka.

Demographics
 the 2011 Census of India, Tonse East had a population of 7,911 with 3,758 males and 4,153 females.

References

External links
 http://Udupi.nic.in/

Cities and towns in Udupi district